Phillip Sand Hansel (February 18, 1925 – August 6, 2010), known as Phill or Phil Hansel, was an American swimming coach. 

He was the swimming coach at the University of Houston for 39 years, from 1957 to 1998. He also served as a coach or manager on two Olympic teams and helped found the American Swimming Coaches Association.

He was named the Southwest Conference's Swimming Coach of the Year three times, in 1975, 1985 and 1986.

References

1925 births
American swimming coaches
American diving coaches
College diving coaches in the United States
Houston Cougars swimming coaches
2010 deaths